Jason Bredle (February 16, 1976 – ) is an American poet and translator. Born in Indianapolis, he received degrees in English literature and Spanish from Indiana University, where he was named Ruth Halls Outstanding Young Artist in Poetry, and an MFA from the University of Michigan, where he earned a Hopwood Award. He's the author of four books and four chapbooks of poetry, including Standing in Line for the Beast, winner of the 2006 New Issues Poetry Prize, and Carnival, selected as Editor's Choice for the 2012 Akron Series in Poetry. A recipient of a grant from the Illinois Arts Council, his poems have been anthologized in 180 More: Extraordinary Poems for Every Day from Random House, Poems about Horses from Alfred A. Knopf, and Seriously Funny from the University of Georgia Press. In addition to poetry, his contributions to the field of linguistics and health outcomes have appeared in the International Journal of Infectious Diseases, Journal of Palliative Medicine, the ATA Chronicle, and have been presented at international forums in the U.S., Canada, France, and the Netherlands, among other places.

Books
 Meditations in a Helicopter About to Explode Over a Guy Covered in Chum, Surfing Off of Shark Bay Beach (MWC Press, 2015)
 Carnival (University of Akron Press, 2012)
 The Book of Evil (Dream Horse Press, 2011)
 Smiles of the Unstoppable (Magic Helicopter Press, 2011)
 Class Project (Publishing Genius Press, 2010)
 Pain Fantasy (Red Morning Press, 2007)
 Standing in Line for the Beast (New Issues Poetry & Prose, 2007)
 A Twelve Step Guide (New Michigan Press, 2004)

Awards
 2014 Susan K. Collins/Mississippi Valley Chapbook Prize
 2012 Illinois Arts Council Individual Artist Support
 2010 Dream Horse Press National Chapbook Prize
 2006 New Issues Poetry Prize
 2004 New Michigan Press Chapbook Prize

External links
 Verse Daily
 Vouched, review of Smiles of the Unstoppable
 H-NGM-N, review of Smiles of the Unstoppable
 HTML Giant, review of Smiles of the Unstoppable
 BOMB Interview with Ben Mirov
 Bookslut, review of Standing in Line for the Beast
 Barn Owl Review, review of Standing in Line for the Beast
 Rattle, review of Standing in Line for the Beast
 Diagram, review of Standing in Line for the Beast
 The Jet Fuel Review: Three Poems
 Poem: "On the Way to the 53-B District Court of Livingston County, October 1, 1999"
 Poem: "The Horse's Adventure"

Living people
University of Michigan alumni
Year of birth missing (living people)